Goran Vincetić (born 25 September 1975) is a retired Croatian football player and former manager of NK Zagreb.

Playing career
Vincetić played for NK Čakovec, NK Rijeka and NK Međimurje in Croatia, NK Primorje in Slovenia, and Dinamo Tirana in Albania. He spent his later years in the Austrian lower leagues.

Maangerial career
He was named manager of Maksimir in January 2021, but left the club in October that year for unclear reasons. He was dismissed as coach and sports director at hometown club Međimurje in June 2022.

References

External links
 
Profile at 1hnl.net
Profile at Prvaliga.si

1975 births
Living people
Sportspeople from Čakovec
Association football defenders
Croatian footballers
NK Istra players
NK Varaždin players
NK Čakovec players
NK Primorje players
HNK Rijeka players
NK Međimurje players
FK Dinamo Tirana players
SC Weiz players
Croatian Football League players
Slovenian PrvaLiga players
Kategoria Superiore players
Austrian Regionalliga players
Austrian Landesliga players
Austrian 2. Landesliga players
Croatian expatriate footballers
Expatriate footballers in Slovenia
Croatian expatriate sportspeople in Slovenia
Expatriate footballers in Albania
Croatian expatriate sportspeople in Albania
Expatriate footballers in Austria
Croatian expatriate sportspeople in Austria
Croatian football managers
NK Zagreb managers
NK Međimurje managers
HNK Rijeka non-playing staff